Průlom is a 1946 Czechoslovak drama film directed by Karel Steklý.

Cast
 Jindřich Plachta as Matej Domazlík - shoemaker
 Ella Nollová as Marjánka Domazlíková
 Jan Pivec as Vojta Domazlík
 Theodor Pištěk as Portreeve Trachta
 Jaroslav Marvan as Václav Dudácek
 Jirí Plachý as Viceregent
 Gustav Hilmar as Kleps - Farmer / 1st councillor
 Marie Blazková as Klep's Wife
 Jana Romanová as Milka - Klep's daughter
 Svatopluk Beneš as Kandler - City Manager

References

External links
 

1946 films
1946 drama films
Czech drama films
Czechoslovak drama films
1940s Czech-language films
Czech black-and-white films
Czechoslovak black-and-white films
Films directed by Karel Steklý
1940s Czech films